Humlegården is a major park in the district of Östermalm in Stockholm, Sweden. The park borders on Karlavägen in the north, Sturegatan in the east, Humlegårdsgatan in the south and Engelbrektsgatan in the west. It is the location of the Swedish Royal Library (Kungliga biblioteket).

History

Royal Park
Humlegården was originally the Royal Fruit Garden, established by King Johan III in the 16th century. The name humle, meaning hop, indicates that hops were one of the major plants grown in the garden. In 1686-87, Queen Ulrika Eleonora of Denmark had a pavilion, Rotundan , built there for herself and her children.

Recreation Park
Already in the 17th century, parts of the park were opened to the public. In 1764, the park was opened for public recreation. There were, however, restrictions on who was allowed to be admitted. From 1773 until 1780, the Stenborg Troupe performed in the  Rotundan, in the former pavilion of the queen, then referred to as Humlegårdsteatern (Humlegården theater). From 1853-1877, the Humlegårdsteatern was again in use.

Public Park
The park was completely opened to the public in 1869. At Engelbrektsplan next to Humlegården, the Djursholm line of the Roslag Railway ended from 1895–1960 and on the other side of the park, on Lidingövägen, the Lidingö Tram line ended from 1914–1967.
Today the park is a popular recreational area for locals, hosting a small soccer ground, skateboard ramp, children's playground and lawns.

Monuments and statues
The park is the site of a number of statues. In the centre of the park is Linnémonumentet, a large statue commemorating  botanist and zoologist Carl von Linné (1707–1778). The monument was designed by Johannes Frithiof Kjellberg (1836-1885) and dates to  1885.

Other notable statues commemorate historian Anders Fryxell (1795–1881), chemist Carl Wilhelm Scheele (1742–1786), author Fredrika Bremer (1801– 1865) and Lutheran priest Peter Wieselgren (1800-1877). Other works include Farfadern by Per Hasselberg (1896), Tuffsen by Egon Möller Nielsen (1949), Isobartema by Martin Holmgren (1970), Cordillera de Los Andes by Francisco Gazitúa (2000) and Hjalmar Söderberg (1869–1941) by Peter Linde (2010).

Gallery

References

Other sources
 Johan Flodmark (1893) Stenborgska skådebanorna: bidrag till Stockholms teaterhistoria (Norstedt, Stockholm)

External links
 Park documents for Humlegården

Parks in Stockholm
Urban public parks